The Down Hill Strugglers, previously known as the Dust Busters, is an American old-time string band trio from Brooklyn, New York, United States. Formed in 2008, the band has been influenced by the music that came out of rural America, including Appalachian traditions, music from the Deep South, and the Western States. The band was originally made up of Craig Judelman, Eli Smith, and Walker Shepard. In 2012, Craig Judelman left the Dust Busters and was replaced by multi-instrumentalist Jackson Lynch. At that time, the band changed its name to the Down Hill Strugglers.

About
Eli Smith and Walker Shepard met while hanging out at the home Peter Stampfel of The Holy Modal Rounders where they also met John Cohen of The New Lost City Ramblers, they met fiddler/multi-instrumentalist Jackson Lynch while hanging around the New York folk music scene at the Jalopy Theatre in Brooklyn.

Smith currently produces his own internet radio show and blog called "Down Home Radio" which is dedicated to the sounds of folk music. He has also founded two festivals to promote old-time music in New York City: The Brooklyn Folk Festival and The Washington Square Park Folk Festival. He also teaches banjo to individuals and to classes at the Jalopy Theatre and School of Music in Brooklyn. While giving lessons to his students, he was interviewed on "Caught in the Act," on Brooklyn Independent Television on techniques for five string banjo players.

Shepard developed a love for old-time music by listening to past voices such as Roscoe Holcomb, Gaither Carlton, Fiddlin' John Carson, and B.F. Shelton. By listening to past musicians, he has developed a personal style that fits into old-time music, but also allows younger generations to relate and connect to the music.

Style and influence
Their style of music is influenced by rural old time traditions of Appalachia, the Deep South, and the Western States. The band is also influenced by the folk musicians who have played before them and strive to introduce this style of music to a younger generation. They have met with individuals such as banjo player, Pat Conte, Alice Gerrard, Clyde Davenport, the late fiddler Joe Thompson.

Career
Over the course of their career, they have toured across the United States and Europe and have appeared at numerous festivals that encourage the preservation of folk life and music. In 2010, they received a special invitation from the US Embassy in Sofia to represent American folk music at the Bourgas International Folklore Festival and also be showcased at the Apollonia Festival of the Arts in Sozopol. They have also performed at film festivals such as the Woodstock Film Festival alongside John Cohen while he was screening his latest documentary "Roscoe Holcomb: From Daisy Kentucky." In 2010 they played at the Dock Boggs festival in Norton, Virginia and were asked back for a repeat performance at the 2011 festival.

They have been featured on radio shows such as WoodSongs Old-Time Radio Hour and are still archived on the WoodSongs website for listening. The band also has been featured on KEXP 90.3 FM Radio alongside John Cohen.

The Dust Busters released three albums: a self-titled album (2009), Prohibition is a Failure (2010), featuring John Cohen, and Old Man Below (2012).

Members
 Walker Shepard: Vocals, Guitar, Banjo Bantar, Fiddle
 Jackson Lynch: Vocals, Fiddle, Guitar
 Eli Smith: Vocals, Guitar, Banjo, Manjo, Bantar, Harmonica, Autoharp

Discography
 The Dust Busters (2009)
 Prohibition is a Failure (2010)
 Old Man Below (2012, Smithsonian Folkways)
 Inside Llewyn Davis (Soundtrack album, 2013, Nonesuch)
 Home Recordings Vol. 1 (2013)
 Show Me The Way to Go Home (2014)
 Lone Prairie (2017, Jalopy Records)

Awards
Independent Music Awards 2013: Old Man Below - Best Bluegrass Album

References

External links
Official Website
 The Dust Busters Website
 The Dust Busters Official Myspace
 Down Home Radio Show
 The Brooklyn Folk Festival

American folk musical groups
Old-time bands
Musical groups from Brooklyn